Savage Messiah is a 1972 British biographical drama film of the life of French sculptor Henri Gaudier-Brzeska, made by Russ-Arts and distributed by MGM. It was directed and produced by Ken Russell, with Harry Benn as associate producer, from a screenplay by Christopher Logue, based on the book Savage Messiah by H. S. Ede. Much of the content of Ede's book came from letters sent between Henri Gaudier-Brzeska and his lover Sophie Brzeska.

The musical score was by Michael Garrett – though music by Claude Debussy, Alexander Scriabin, and Sergei Prokofiev was also used – and the cinematography by Dick Bush. The sets were designed by Derek Jarman.

Cast
 Dorothy Tutin as Sophie Brzeska
 Scott Antony as Henri Gaudier
 Helen Mirren as Gosh Boyle
 Lindsay Kemp as Angus Corky
 Michael Gough as M. Gaudier
 John Justin as Lionel Shaw
 Aubrey Richards as Mayor
 Peter Vaughan as Museum Attendant
 Ben Aris as Thomas Buff
 Eleanor Fazan as Mdme. Gaudier
 Otto Diamant as Mr. Saltzman
 Imogen Claire as Mavis Coldstream
 Judith Paris as Kate

Production
The film was based on the biography by Jim Ede, who had discovered the story while working at the Tate Gallery. Ede had acquired Sophie Brzeska's estate in 1927 from the British Treasury Solicitor after she died intestate. This acquisition included not only her writings, but also the estate of Henri Gaudier, with many of his works and papers. Ede drew extensively on the letters written by Gaudier to Brzeska, and her writings and other material, when he published A Life of Gaudier-Brzeska (London: W. Heinemann) in 1930; the 1931 and later editions are entitled Savage Messiah.

The book was admired by Ken Russell who said "it will ever be an inspiration to anyone down on their luck with a belief in their own talent, despite the hostility of those who should know better. Here was a tale worth telling on film... although for years it seemed to be nothing but a pipe dream."

Russell had made a number of films about artists, mostly for television, starting with Two Scottish Painters. His success with feature films such as Women in Love encouraged him to turn the book into a feature.

Russell says because the film was about an artist it was considered an "art film" and was difficult to finance. "I ended up double mortgaging my house and finding most of the money myself," he later wrote. "There was a chance I'd end up on the street but I felt I owed Gaudier something. It would have been so easy to go into my father's business and opted for the easy life but Gaudier taught me there was a life outside commerce and it was well worth fighting for."

Russell said the project "was austere and simple... my least glamorous film. I was satiated with flamboyance." He said "I wanted to show artists as workers not people who live in ivory towers." Russell later wrote "it was about passion and sweat... it was about revolution and fuck the art dealers."

He gave the lead roles to Dorothy Tutin, one of Britain's top stage actresses, and Scott Antony, a newcomer from drama school. Russell said Anthony "was chosen out of 300 actors I saw because he was the only one I thought could pick up a hammer and hit a stone. Being an artist is a physical thing."

The production designer was Derek Jarman who had worked on The Devils and who Russell called "the last true bohemian." Some of the budget was provided by the Lee brothers, who also let Russell use their studio.

Russell arranged distribution through MGM, for whom he had just made The Boy Friend. "My deal with MGM is that they'll show my version for three weeks at least," he said just before the film was released. "Then they can hack it up."

Reception
According to Rex Reed the film was a "tremendous hit with audiences" at the Venice Film Festival although not with critics.

The Los Angeles Times said the film was "utterly unconvincing."

Russell described the film as "just two people talking". He said it and Song of Summer helped get him the job of directing Altered States, because it showed he could handle actors.

Bibliography
 Dilys Powell "The sorcerer's apprentice" (film review in The Sunday Times; 17 Sept. 1972)
 Richard Combs "Savage Messiah" (review) in: Monthly Film Bulletin; 1972, p. 217

References

External links
 
 Savage Messiah at Trailers from Hell

1972 films
1970s historical films
British historical films
British biographical films
Films based on biographies
Metro-Goldwyn-Mayer films
Films directed by Ken Russell
Biographical films about sculptors
Cultural depictions of 20th-century painters
Cultural depictions of French men
1970s biographical films
1970s English-language films
1970s British films